The following are the national records in Olympic weightlifting in Algeria. Records are maintained in each weight class for the snatch lift, clean and jerk lift, and the total for both lifts by the Federation Algerienne D'Halterophilie.

Current records

Men

Women

Historical records

Men (1998–2018)

Women (1998–2018)

References

External links 

Algeria
Records
Olympic weightlifting
weightlifting